Campanile is a genus of large sea snails, marine gastropod molluscs in the family Campanilidae.

Biology
All species in this genus have become extinct, except  Campanile symbolicum Iredale, 1917 from southwestern Australia. They used to flourish in the Tethys Sea and underwent a widespread adaptive radiation in the Cenozoic.

Species
Species within the genus Campanile include:
 † Campanile auvertianum
 † Campanile brookmani Cox 1930 
 † Campanile claytonense
 † Campanile cornucopiae
 † Campanile dilloni
 † Campanile elongatum
 † Campanile giganteum (Lamarck, 1804) - a gigantic fossil species from the Eocene
 † Campanile gigas Martin 1881
 † Campanile greenellum
 † Campanile hebertianum
 † Campanile houbricki
 † Campanile parisiense
 † Campanile paratum
 Campanile symbolicum Iredale, 1917 - a living Australian species. This is the only extant species of Campanilidae.
 † Campanile tchihatcheffi d’Archiac 1850 
 † Campanile trevorjacksoni Portell & Donovan, 2008 - a fossil species from the Eocene
 † Campanile uniplicatum (d'Orbigny, 1850) 
 † Campanile villaltai

References

 Fossilworks: Campanile
 M. Harzhauser. 2007. Oligocene and Aquitanian gastropod faunas from the Sultanate of Oman and their biogeographic implications for the western Indo-Pacific. Palaeontographica Abteilung A 280:75-121

External links 

Campanilidae